Santissima Trinità (Italian for Most Holy Trinity) may refer to:

 Santissima Trinità di Cava de’ Tirreni
 Santissima Trinità di Saccargia, Codrongianos
 Santissima Trinità, Lucca
 Santissima Trinità alla Cesarea, Naples
 Santissima Trinità delle Monache, Naples
 Santissima Trinità dei Pellegrini, Naples
 Santissima Trinità degli Spagnoli, Naples
 Santissima Trinità dei Monti, Rome
 Santissima Trinità dei Pellegrini, Rome
 Santissima Trinità a Via Condotti, Rome
 Abbey of the Santissima Trinità (Venosa)
 Santissima Trinità, Verona

See also 
 Holy Trinity Church (disambiguation)